Khvosh Makan or Khowsh Makan may refer to:
 Khvosh Makan, Bushehr
 Khvosh Makan, Fars